The discography of Gainesville, Florida-based punk rock band Against Me! consists of seven studio albums, four EPs, two live albums, two DVDs, fifteen singles, five demos, and sixteen music videos.

Against Me! was formed in 1997 by singer/guitarist Laura Jane Grace as a solo act, occasionally performing with backing musicians. After releasing several demos and EPs the band released their debut studio album, Against Me! Is Reinventing Axl Rose, through No Idea Records. Their second album, 2003's Against Me! as the Eternal Cowboy, was released by Fat Wreck Chords. They followed this up with their third album Searching for a Former Clarity in 2005, which became their first album to chart on the Billboard 200. In 2007, Against Me! signed to Sire Records and released their forth studio album New Wave, which debuted at no. 57 on the Billboard 200 and featured their first charting single, "Thrash Unreal". They released their fifth album White Crosses in 2010.

In 2011 the band launched their own record label, Total Treble Music. Their first full-length album under the label,  Transgender Dysphoria Blues, was released in 2014, followed by Shape Shift with Me in 2016.

Albums

Studio albums

Live albums

Video albums

Demo albums

Extended plays

Singles

Other charted songs

Music videos

Other appearances
The following Against Me! songs were released on compilation albums, soundtracks, and other releases. This is not an exhaustive list; songs that were first released on the band's albums, EPs, or singles are not included.

Notes

References

External links
 Against Me! discography at the band's official website. Includes cover art, details, pressing information, and song lyrics for each release.
 

Discography
Punk rock group discographies
Discographies of American artists